José Rogeiro Antunes Estefane Júnior (born March 3, 1980, in Curitiba, Brazil), known as Rogério Pilo, is a Brazilian footballer.

External links

1980 births
Living people
Brazilian footballers
América Futebol Clube (SP) players
Club Athletico Paranaense players
Atlético Clube Paranavaí players
Esporte Clube São Bento players
Porto Alegre Futebol Clube players
Brazilian expatriate footballers
Sur SC players
Al-Arabi SC (Kuwait) players
C.D. Luis Ángel Firpo footballers
Expatriate footballers in Oman
Expatriate footballers in China
Expatriate footballers in Kuwait
Expatriate footballers in El Salvador
Brazilian expatriate sportspeople in Oman
Brazilian expatriate sportspeople in China
Brazilian expatriate sportspeople in Kuwait
Brazilian expatriate sportspeople in El Salvador
Footballers from Curitiba
Association football forwards
Kuwait Premier League players